The 1995-1996 season was FK Sarajevo's 47th season in history, and their 2nd consecutive season in the top flight of Bosnian football.

Players

Squad

(Captain)

(Captain)

(C)

Statistics

Kit

Competitions

Premier League

League table

References

FK Sarajevo seasons
Sarajevo